A hot air balloon is a lighter than air aircraft.

Hot air balloon may also refer to:

 Hot Air Balloon (rock opera), a rock opera written in 1998
 "Hot Air Balloon" (song), a song on the album Ocean Eyes by Owl City
 Hot air ballooning, the activity involving hot air balloons

See also
 Air balloon (disambiguation)
 Balloon (aeronautics)